Martin Andrew Green  (born 20 July 1948) is an Australian engineer and professor at the University of New South Wales who works on solar energy. He was awarded the 2021 Japan Prize for his achievements in the "Development of High-Efficiency Silicon Photovoltaic Devices". He is editor-in-chief of the academic journal Progress in Photovoltaics.

Education
Green was born in Brisbane on 20 July 1948, and was educated at the selective Brisbane State High School, graduated from University of Queensland and completed his PhD on a Commonwealth Scholarship at McMaster University in Canada, where he specialised in solar energy. In 1974, at the University of New South Wales, he initiated the Solar Photovoltaics Group which soon worked on the development of silicon solar cells. The group had their success in the early 80s through producing a 20% efficient silicon cell, which now has been improved to 25%.

Research
Green has published several books on solar cells both for popular science and deep research. The "buried contact solar cell" was developed at UNSW in 1984. Green also served on the Board of the Sydney-based Pacific Solar Pty Ltd (later known as CSG Solar), as Research Director. Green's portrait was painted with fellow scientist Ross Garnaut for the Archibald Prize 2010. The painting was a finalist, losing to a portrait of Tim Minchin.

Awards and honours
Green has received several awards including:

 1982 Pawsey Medal (Australian Academy) 
 1988 Award for Outstanding Achievement in Energy Research
 1990 IEEE Cherry Award
 1992 CSIRO External Medal
 1995 IEEE Ebers Award
 1999 Australia Prize
 2000 Gold Medal from the Spanish Engineering Academy
 2000 Medal of Engineering Excellence for Distinguished Achievement in the Service of Humanity from the World Engineering Federation (Hannover, 2000), 
 2000 Millennium Award from the World Renewable Congress 
 2002 Right Livelihood Award for "his dedication and outstanding success in the harnessing of solar energy, the key technological challenge of our age."
 2003 Karl Böer Solar Energy Medal of Merit Award from the University of Delaware
 2006 Finalist, European Inventor of the Year (together with Stuart Wenham)
 2008 Winner, 2008 Scientist of the Year Award
 2009 Zayed Future Energy Prize finalist, recognised at the award ceremony for his ground breaking research in photovoltaic (PV) technology that will result in increased efficiencies, bringing solar energy closer to grid parity.
 2012 Member of the Order of Australia "for service to science education as an academic and researcher, particularly through the development of photovoltaic solar cell technology, and to professional associations."
 2013 Fellow of the Royal Society of London

His nomination for the Royal Society reads: 
 2015 James Cook Medal of the Royal Society of New South Wales
 2016 Ian Wark Medal and Lecture
 2018  Celebrated Members of IEEE Electron Devices Society
 2018 The Global Energy Prize for research, development and educational activities in the field of photovoltaics that have revolutionized the efficiency and costs of solar photovoltaics, making this now the lowest cost option for bulk electricity supply
 2021 Japan Prize
 2022 Millennium Technology Prize

References

External links 
 Australia Prize website
 Buried grid technology ("laser grooved buried contact solar cells").

1948 births
Living people
People associated with solar power
20th-century Australian engineers
Academic staff of the University of New South Wales
University of Queensland alumni
McMaster University alumni
Members of the Order of Australia
Australia Prize recipients
Fellows of the Australian Academy of Technological Sciences and Engineering
People educated at Brisbane State High School
Fellows of the Australian Academy of Science
Fellows of the Royal Society
Recipients of the M. A. Sargent Medal
21st-century Australian engineers
Australian expatriates in Canada